Arroba is a Portuguese and Spanish custom unit of weight, mass or volume. Its symbol is @.

History
The word arroba has its origin in Arabic ar-rubʿ  (الربع) or "quarter," specifically the fourth part (of a quintal), which defined the average load which a donkey could carry.

Spain and Portugal
In weight it was equal to 32 pounds (14.7 kg) in Portugal and 25 pounds (11.5 kg) in Spain.

The unit is still used in Portugal and Spain by cork merchants and pig farmers.

Arroba and bushel as weight units are similar (15 kg).

Latin America

The unit is still used in Brazil by the agricultural sector, mainly in the cotton and cattle business.

Internet

In Spanish-speaking and Portuguese-speaking countries, "arroba" has continued as the word for the "@" symbol used in Internet email addresses.

See also
 Portuguese customary units
 Spanish customary units

References

Units of mass